The International Hotel & Restaurant Association (IHRA) is an international trade association representing the interests of the hotel and restaurant industries.

History

January 1869: Forty-five Hotelmen met at Hotel Trier, in Koblenz, Germany and created an Alliance under the name of All Hotelmen Alliance (AHA) with the aim of facilitating growth and organization in the industry. In that era, hotels were of a different standard, and needed a strong voice to communicate their needs and sustain their businesses.

Moving forward, in April 1921, various European, African and North and South American hotel associations met and decided to merge into a new globally recognized, international association, under the name of the International Hotels Alliance (IHA).

November 1947: Shortly after the end of the Second World War and the creation of the United Nations, hoteliers from the IHA met together with The European Aubergistes Association, and with the Asian Innkeepers Association in London, United Kingdom, and decided to merge into a larger international association aimed at defending the hospitality private sector worldwide, by lobbying governments, public sectors, and the Military. This was the launch of the International Hotels Association (IHA).

September 1949: The French Government registered IHA and granted it the status of a Public Utility Association and a Non-Profit status. Their head office was moved from London and established in the heart of Paris, France.

December 1949: The Argentinean Government recognized IHA and gave it a Non-Profit status, under the name of Asociación Internacional de Hosteleria.

May 1950: The West German Government recognized IHA and gave it a Non-Resident Association status, under the name of Internationaler Hotelverband.

November 1953: The United Nations Economic and Social Council (ECOSOC) gave IHA the status of Consultative Representation of hoteliers worldwide. Further, the United Nations Conference on Trade and Development granted IHA a Permanent Observer status.

October 1960:The Hotel Association of New York (HANYC) applied to join IHA and become the first US association to join IHA and to become a full member.

January 1978: New by-laws and articles of incorporation came into effect worldwide and for the first time, all global IHA members met and voted to adopt them effective immediately for a period of 30 years.

November 1997: IHA merged with the International Organization of Hotels and Restaurants, creating a new entity that came to be known as the International Hotels and Restaurants Associations (IH&RA).

March 2005: The United Nations affirmed the recognition of IH&RA.

January 2008: IH&RA’s head office was moved to Lausanne, Switzerland, to correspond with the adoption of new articles of corporations and by-laws.
 
February 2008: The Swiss government registered IH&RA with its new adopted status.

May 2016: Dr. Ghassan Aidi was elected President of IH&RA for a term of four years.

In the present time, IH&RA has expanded its offices to Geneva, Paris and Barcelona, with new international offices opening soon in Washington, D.C. and Hong Kong.

Structure
IH&RA members are national hotel and restaurant associations throughout the world, and international and national hotel and restaurant chains representing some 50 brands. Officially recognized by the United Nations, IH&RA monitors and lobbies international agencies on behalf of the industry, estimated to comprise 400,000 hotels and 8 million restaurants, employs 60 million people and contributes 950 billion USD annually to the global economy.

Awards
 Hotelier of The Century
 Emeraude Hotel of The Year
 Diamond Leader of The Year

See also
Confederation of Tourism and Hospitality

References

External links

1947 establishments in England
Hospitality industry organizations
Hotel
Organisations based in Lausanne
Organizations established in 1947